Fortunes of War is a 1994 Direct-to-video action film filmed in the Philippines directed by Thierry Notz that was produced by as well as starring Matt Salinger.

Plot
Freelance international humanitarian aid worker Peter Kernan quits his work in Thailand in disgust due to the political machinations that he feels is not helping the people who deserve aid.  He finds himself in a quandary as his own relief efforts have left him destitute and owing his friend Canadian diplomatic officer Carl Pimmler a large amount of money.  Pimmler has realised he will never be adequately rewarded for being a minor government diplomatic officer and offers Kernan a piece of his action.  Kernan will drive an army truck loaded with medical supplies into Cambodia where he will be paid in gold bullion by a local warlord.  Pimmler has the power to provide the relevant documents for Kernan's mission with Pimmler's business associate Border Patrol Police Colonel Shan providing an escort of a lieutenant and a squad of soldiers in two jeeps. Accompanying Kernan will be Pimmler's wife Johanna a surgeon who has recently returned from Burma where she provided medical aid to the local populace.

Kernan faces danger from mined roads, thieves, the Royal Thai Police, the Khmer Rouge as well as from Colonel Shan and his Australian mercenary Rodger Crawley.

Cast
Matt Salinger	... 	Peter Kernan
Sam Jenkins	... 	Johanna Pimmler 
Haing S. Ngor 	... 	Khoy Thuon
Martin Sheen 	... 	Francis Labeck
Michael Ironside 	... 	Carl Pimmler
Michael Nouri 	... 	Father Aran
Ronnie Lazaro 	... 	Border Patrol Lieutenant
Frankie J. Holden 	... 	Rodger Crawley
Vic Diaz 	... 	Colonel Shan
Herbie Go 	... 	Khmer Rouge Officer 
John Getz 	... 	Franklin Hewitt
Louie Katana 	... 	Corporal
Joonee Gamboa 	... 	Sifu the Witch
Adriana Agcaoili 	... 	Nun

External links
 

1994 films
1994 action films
Films shot in the Philippines
Films set in Thailand
Films set in Cambodia
Films directed by Thierry Notz
1990s English-language films
American action films
American direct-to-video films
1990s American films